Fyodor Andreyevich Sergeyev (March 19, 1883 – July 24, 1921), better known as Comrade Artyom, was a Russian Bolshevik revolutionary, Soviet politician, agitator, and journalist. He was a close friend of Sergei Kirov and Joseph Stalin. Sergeyev was an ideologist of the Donetsk–Krivoy Rog Soviet Republic.

Early life

Fyodor Artyom was born in the village of Glebovo, Fatezhsky Uyezd, Kursk Governorate, Russian Empire near the city of Fatezh to a family of peasants. His father Andrey Arefyevich Sergeyev was a contractor to a construction porter, who in 1888 moved the family to Yekaterinoslav. In 1901 Fyodor finished studies at the Yekaterinoslav realschule. He went on to attend the Imperial Moscow Technical College. Sergeyev joined the Russian Social Democratic Labour Party and became interested in revolutionary thinking, adopting the nickname 'Artyom'.

Party career
In 1901, Artyom was arrested for taking part in a student demonstration, and spent four months in Voronezh prison. After his release, he emigrated to Paris, where he studied at the 'Russian Higher Free School'. From 1902 he was a member of the Russian Social Democratic Labour Party, later remaining with the Bolshevik faction of the party. He returned to Russia in 1903, and was a prominent party agitator in Yekaterinoslav, where he moved from factory to factory, finding work as a stoker. In 1905, he moved to Kharkiv, where he headed the Bolshevik organisation and in December, he led an armed rebellion by factory workers. This made him well known to the police, but he was able to evade arrest until later in 1906, when he was interned in Kharkov prison, but escaped. He was assigned by the Bolsheviks to run the organisation in Perm, where he was arrested again. After nearly three years in prison, he was deported to Siberia.

In 1910 he escaped through Korea and Japan to Brisbane, Australia where he organized the Union of Russian Emigrants. In 1912 Sergeyev became chief-editor of "Echo of Australia" and was better known as "Big Tom". He joined the Australian Socialist Party and was involved in trade-unionist opposition to the First World War. In 1917, after the February revolution, he returned to Russia, becoming a leader of the Bolshevik faction in the Kharkiv council.

In October 1917, Artyom was the organizer of a military coup-d'etat in Kharkiv and the whole Donets basin region. At the 1st congress of Soviets in Ukraine he was elected to the Central Executive Committee of Ukraine and later appointed the Ukrainian Narkom of Trade and Industry. In 1918, while Ukraine was under German occupation, Artyom was a chairman of the Sovnarkom of the unrecognized Donetsk-Krivoy Rog Soviet Republic in Ukraine and Narkom of Public Economy. His actions secured the nationalization of industrial centers concentrated in the eastern Ukraine. Sergeyev became one of the organizers of Ukrainian Central Military-Revolutionary Committee in resistance to the Central Powers and Kaledin's Cossacks. On March 27 he organized the Donetsk Army by the order of Vladimir Antonov-Ovseyenko, however by the end of April 1918 that army was integrated into the 5th Army of Red Army headed by Kliment Voroshilov.

Political career 

In 1919, when Ukraine was under communist rule again, Artyom was appointed People's Commissar for Agitation and Propaganda, but later in the year he was transferred to Bashkiria (modern name Bashkortostan), as Chairman of the Society for Aid to Bashkiria. He was therefore one of the first Bolsheviks to hold power in a predominantly Muslim part of the former Russian empire.

In April 1920, he was again elected chairman of the Donetsk Provincial Executive Committee. From March 1919 to March 1920 he was a candidate member of the Central Committee of the Russian Communist Party (b). At the 9th and 10th congresses of the RCP (b), he was elected a member of the Central Committee. From November to December 1920  Artyom was executive secretary of the Moscow Committee of the RCP (b), then chairman of the Central Committee of the All-Russian Union of Miners and simultaneously a member of the All-Russian Central Executive Committee.

Death
Fyodor Sergeyev died in 1921 during the test of the Aerowagon. He was buried in Mass Grave No. 12 of the Kremlin Wall Necropolis in Red Square, Moscow.

The city of Bakhmut (now in Ukraine), former center of Donetsk-Krivoy Rog Soviet Republic, was renamed in his honor as Artemivsk in 1924. His infant son Artyom Fyodorovich was adopted by Joseph Stalin.

On 15 May 2015 President of Ukraine Petro Poroshenko signed a bill into law that started a six-month period for the removal of communist monuments and the mandatory renaming of settlements with a name related to Communism. In February 2016, the city of Artemivsk returned to its original name: Bakhmut.

Artemivsk of Luhansk region is named in honor of Artem. From 2014 until its annexation by Russia in 2022, the city was occupied by pro-Russian forces of the Luhansk People's Republic. On May 12, 2016, Ukraine's national parliament, the Verkhovna Rada, decided to restore the name of Kypuche as part of the country's decommunization process. However, the local authorities did not recognize the name change and Russia has continued not to after annexation.

In fiction
In Thomas Keneally's novel The People's Train, the lead character, Artem — aka "Tom" — Samsurov, is loosely based on the life of Sergeyev.

See also
 List of mayors of Kharkiv

References

1883 births
1921 deaths
People from Fatezhsky District
People from Fatezhsky Uyezd
Russian Social Democratic Labour Party members
Old Bolsheviks
Central Committee of the Communist Party of the Soviet Union members
Central Committee of the Communist Party of Ukraine (Soviet Union) members
Russian Constituent Assembly members
All-Russian Central Executive Committee members
Chairmen of the All-Ukrainian Central Executive Committee
Mayors of Kharkiv
Donetsk–Krivoy Rog Soviet Republic
Russian communists
People of the Russian Revolution
Decommunization in Ukraine
Emigrants from the Russian Empire to Australia
Accidental deaths in the Soviet Union
Railway accident deaths in Russia
Burials at the Kremlin Wall Necropolis